Aleksa Kovačević (1 February 1910 – 22 August 1979) was a Yugoslavian athlete. He competed in the men's shot put at the 1936 Summer Olympics, representing Yugoslavia.

References

1910 births
1979 deaths
Athletes (track and field) at the 1936 Summer Olympics
Bosnia and Herzegovina male shot putters
Yugoslav male shot putters
Olympic athletes of Yugoslavia
People from the Condominium of Bosnia and Herzegovina
Sportspeople from Nevesinje